Bonus commonly means:
 Bonus, a Commonwealth term for a distribution of profits to a with-profits insurance policy
 Bonus payment, an extra payment received as a reward for doing one's job well or as an incentive

Bonus may also refer to:

Places
 Bonus, Pennsylvania
 Bonus, Texas
 10028 Bonus, a main belt asteroid

People
 Bonus (patrician) (6th-century–627), Byzantine statesman and general, active in the reign of Heraclius
 Bonus (Sirmium), a Byzantine general, active in the reign of Justin II (r. 565–578)
 Petrus Bonus, a physician

Brands and enterprises
 Bónus, an Icelandic supermarket
 TeST TST-14 Bonus, a Czech glider
 Bofors/Nexter Bonus, an artillery round

Energy
 Bonus Energy A/S, a Danish wind turbine manufacturer, later called Siemens Wind Power
 Boiling Nuclear Superheater (BONUS), a decommissioned nuclear facility in Puerto Rico

Games and sports
 Bonus (basketball), a situation wherein one team accumulates a certain number of fouls
 Bonus (Scrabble), a term used in the game Scrabble outside North America, for playing all seven of one's tiles
 Bonus, a type of question in quiz bowl